Nelanglo Parish is a civil parish of King County, New South Wales.

It includes the locality of Bellmount Forest. The main economic activity of the parish is sheep although tourism and wine is growing in importance, due to its close proximity to Canberra.

References

Upper Lachlan Shire
Yass Valley Council